Qeshlaq-e Amirabad (also Romanized as Qeshlāq-e Āmīrābād; also called Āmīrābād) is a village in Akhtarabad Rural District, in the Central District of Malard County, Tehran Province, Iran. Kışlak (or kıșla) is a Turkish word meaning "place to pass the winter" as opposed to "yaylak" (or yayla, a place to pass the summer). At the 2006 census, its population was 322, in 60 families.

References 

Populated places in Malard County